Dobrinka Shokoladova (born 1 May 1983) is a Bulgarian long-distance runner who specializes in the 3000 metres steeplechase.

Competition record

Personal bests
800 metres - 2:11.02 min (2005)
1500 metres - 4:20.47 min (2005)
3000 metres - 9:21.89 min (2005)
3000 metres steeplechase - 9:42.08 min (2007)
5000 metres - 16:45.52 min (2005)
10,000 metres - 33:41.03 min (2006)
Marathon - 2:50:20 min (2005)

References
 

1983 births
Living people
Bulgarian female steeplechase runners
Bulgarian female long-distance runners
Bulgarian female marathon runners
Olympic athletes of Bulgaria
Athletes (track and field) at the 2008 Summer Olympics
World Athletics Championships athletes for Bulgaria
Universiade medalists in athletics (track and field)
Universiade gold medalists for Bulgaria
Competitors at the 2005 Summer Universiade
Medalists at the 2007 Summer Universiade
21st-century Bulgarian women
20th-century Bulgarian women